Hulk: Gray is a December 2003-April 2004 comic book limited series written by Jeph Loeb and illustrated by Tim Sale.

Publication history
The series ran for a total of six issues which followed the early years of Bruce Banner and his problems as the Hulk. Jeph Loeb and Tim Sale also collaborated on other limited series such as: Spider-Man: Blue, Daredevil: Yellow, and Captain America: White. Each series, like Hulk: Gray, followed the early years of the different Marvel Comics heroes.

Plot
Bruce Banner's life was torn apart by the explosion of the Gamma Bomb. From that moment on, he unleashed the strongest creature on Earth, The Incredible Hulk. No matter how powerful he became, his heart could still be shattered by Betty Ross, the daughter of General "Thunderbolt" Ross.

Issues

In other media
The comic was the primary inspiration for the 2008 film The Incredible Hulk.

Collected editions

References

Hulk (comics) titles